Professional football may refer to:

Professionalism in association football
Professional gridiron football
National Football League
Canadian Football League
Australian Football League